Tarmani (also Romanized as Tarmanī) is a village in Bakeshluchay Rural District, in the Central District of Urmia County, West Azerbaijan Province, Iran. At the 2006 census, its population was 143, in 40 families. On January 9, 2011, Iran Air Flight 277 crashed near the village, killing 78 people.

References 

Populated places in Urmia County